is a Japanese manga artist and a former employee of Bandai and Arc System Works. His most famous work is the series Elfen Lied which was adapted in a 13-episode anime series by the studio Arms. He lives in Tokyo, Japan.

Works
 (2002–2005, serialized in Weekly Young Jump, Shueisha)
 Tanpenshū Flip Flap (2008 Shueisha)
 Elfen Lied (2000, short story)
 
 MOL
 
 Carriera
 
 Allumage
 Lime Yellow
 Flip Flap
  (2007–2010, serialized in Weekly Young Jump, Shueisha) 
  (2012–2016, serialized in Weekly Young Jump, Shueisha)
  (2012–2017, art by Mengo Yokoyari)
  (2017–ongoing, serialized in Weekly Young Magazine, Kodansha)

Legacy
The asteroid 49382 Lynnokamoto (1998 XG5) was named after him.

References

External links
  
 

Elfen Lied
Living people
Manga artists from Wakayama Prefecture
1970 births